is a Ryukyuan gusuku located in the north of Agena district of Uruma, Okinawa, in former Gushikawa City. It was built on a base of Ryukyuan limestone and occupies .

History
The Ōgawa Aji, or regional ruler of the Ōgawa Magiri of the Ryukyu Kingdom, occupied the castle for several generations. Details of the history of both the castle and the Aji are unclear, and no archaeological excavation has been carried out on the castle. It was likely built in the 14th century. The Ōgawa reached their greatest period of prosperity in the 15th century. At some point the castle was destroyed by the Ryukyuan army. The outer gate of Agena Castle no longer exists, but as the inner gate is bored through the limestone foundation and is surround on both sides with quarried rocks, it still exists. The inner gate is an early example of an arched castle gate, and is protected as a national treasure of Japan. The castle remains now holds numerous utaki sites of worship of the Ryukyuan religion, and is scattered with fragments of Chinese ceramics from the 14th to the 15th century. The castle was designated as a Nationally Designated Cultural Property S47-5-165 on 15 May 1972. The area around the castle is now used as Agena Park.

References

Castles in Okinawa Prefecture